Independence Street (vulytsia Nezalezhnosti) is considered the central street of Ivano-Frankivsk. It runs from west to east and passes the original city's center 250–300 meters south from it. Starting at the west side of the Viche Maidan what is known as the Halych Street Independence Street makes its way along the old Tysmenytsia road east to Bystrytsia river, passing which it changes its name to Tysmenytsia Street running through the city's suburbs towards the city of Tysmenytsia.

Brief history

The street is not the oldest in the city and was formed after the demolition of the city's fortifications at the end of the 18th century. The street began to gain its importance with establishment of railroad through the city around the 1860s, which was passing the old Stanislawow on the north-eastern side running from the north to the south-east. Until 1869 the street, unknown whether officially or not, was simply referred to as Tysmenytsia Road. On July 1, 1869 at the 300 Anniversary of the Union of Lublin the street was officially renamed into Leon Sapieha Street (Ulica Sapiezinskogo) after Leon Sapieha, a Polish parliamentarian. That name the street carried almost until the Soviet invasion in 1939. It was during that time that Independence Street was becoming the central street of the city. With the establishment of the West Ukrainian People's Republic in the region (1918-1922), the name of the street changed to Shevchenko Street (1919-1922) after Taras Shevchenko. With the establishment of the Soviet regime and until 1993 with the displacing the city's Lenin monument the street was called Soviet.

Architectural monuments
 monument of Ivan Franko
 Regional Music-Drama Theater
 architectural ensemble of stometrivka
 Gartenberg's Passage (shopping mall "Malva")
 Hausvald Building
 others

Cultural sights
 The city's youth library
 Cinema theater "Kosmos" (former historical Jewish cemetery)
 The city's children puppet theater
 others

List of intersecting streets
 Halych Street
 Levko Bachynsky Street
 Dmytro Vitovsky Street
 Markian Shashkevych Street
 Ivan Vahylevych Street
 Sich Riflemen Street
 Ivan Franko Street
 Bohdan Lepky Street
 Stepan Bandera Street
 Mariyka Pidhiryanka Street
 Dashevych Street
 Roman Shukhevych Street 
 Shota Rustaveli Street
 Railway Street
 Anton Chekhov Street
 Khryplyn Street
 Truskavets Street
 Crimea Street
 Traktor Street
 Uhornyky Street
 Mykytyntsi Street
 Mykytyntsi Lane
 Volodymyr Ivasyuk Street
 others

References

External links
  Virtual tour around the city of Ivano-Frankivsk
  List of Ivano-Frankivsk city streets

Streets in Ivano-Frankivsk